Virgin Experience Days is an experience day company launched in 1989 as Acorne Sports and is a brand licence holder for gift experiences and gift cards marketed under the Virgin name. Acorne took over Virgin Experience Days, which had been  part of Richard Branson's Virgin Group, in 2002.

History 
Beginning as 'Virgin Experience' in March 2001 and originally catering to corporate clients in the form of employee and customer incentives the company expanded over the years from targeting mainly those in London to include the rest of the country. In the summer of 2018  the company rebranded to become the newly named 'Virgin Experience Days Limited '.

Starting from a modest product range including other products from the Virgin Group such as Virgin Balloon Flights, the catalogue steadily expanded to include more modern forms of experiences. Nowadays their experiences include skydiving, zorbing and supercar driving alongside celebrity chef dining experiences, historical tours, afternoon teas and more.

Virgin Experience Days are also frequently given away in competitions  and work in partnership with bloggers for more in depth reviews of their experiences. The company's business-to-business division was relaunched in 2017 under the name ‘Virgin Incentives’, following Virgin Experience Days' buyout by Inflexion Private Equity.

References

External links
 Official Website
Personalized Gifts

Virgin Group
Giving